The CMLL International Gran Prix (2019) was a lucha libre, or professional wrestling, tournament produced and scripted by the Mexican professional wrestling promotion Consejo Mundial de Lucha Libre (CMLL; "World Wrestling Council" in Spanish) which took place on August 30, 2019 in Arena México, Mexico City, Mexico, CMLL's main venue. The 2019 International Gran Prix was the sixteenth time CMLL has held an International Gran Prix tournament since 1994. All International Gran Prix tournaments have been a one-night tournament, always as part of CMLL's Friday night CMLL Super Viernes shows.

The match came down to Negro Casas and Volador Jr., both representing Mexico, which saw Volador Jr. take advantage of the situation to pin Casas to claim the International Gran Prix trophy for a second time. On the undercard the storyline between Último Guerrero and Ciber the Main Man, also drawing in Gilbert el Boricua as part of the evolving storyline.

Production

Background
In 1994, the Mexican professional wrestling promotion Consejo Mundial de Lucha Libre created the International Gran Prix tournament which took place on April 15 that saw Rayo de Jalisco Jr. defeat King Haku to win the tournament. the tournament became annual tournament but after the 1998 tournament, the tournament became inactive. in 2002, the tournament returned with new rules. (Mexico and International group vs another Mexican and International group and then Mexicans vs Japanese and finally Mexico vs International) the 2019 tournament will be 16th in the series. The tournament traditionally sees a team of Mexican born CMLL wrestlers face off against foreign-born wrestlers, for the 2019 tournament this meant wrestlers from the United States or Puerto Rico.

Storylines
The 2019 Gran Prix show will feature an undisclosed number of professional wrestling matches scripted by CMLL with some wrestlers involved in scripted feuds. The wrestlers portray either heels (referred to as rudos in Mexico, those that play the part of the "bad guys") or faces (técnicos in Mexico, the "good guy" characters) as they perform.

Team Resto del Mundo
Big Daddy
Jay Briscoe (USA, Ring of Honor; Participated in 2018)
Delirious (USA, Ring of Honor; replaced Mark Briscoe who was injured)
Luke Hawx (USA, The Crash)
Kenny King (USA, Ring of Honor; Participated in 2017)
Mecha Wolf 450 (Puerto Rico, The Crash)
Matt Taven (USA, Ring of Honor; participated in 2017 and 2018)
Oraculo (USA, The Crash)
Team Mexico
Cavernario
Negro Casas
El Cuatrero
Diamante Azul (Won the 2017 Gran Prix)
Dragon Lee
Rush
Soberano Jr.
Volador Jr. (Won the 2016 Gran Prix)

Matches

References

2019 in professional wrestling
August 2019 events in Mexico
CMLL International Gran Prix
Events in Mexico City
2019 in Mexico